Grabovë e Sipërme (also: Grabova;) is a village in Albania inhabited by  Aromanians. The village is located in the former municipality of Lenie. At the 2015 local government reform it became part of the municipality Gramsh.

History 
Grabova was a medieval town created in the 10th century. Aromanians have left Grabova on several occasions, although the village has never been completely deserted. The first wave of depopulation took place in the 17th century, when Grabova shared the fate of Moscopolis and during the inter-war period, starting with 1931, many of Grabovars emigrated to Elbasan and Lushnjë. In 1933, 15 families from the village emigrated to Romania; they initially settled in Southern Dobruja and then, in 1940, in the village of Nisipari, Constanța County, from where they moved to the larger nearby towns (Medgidia, Ovidiu, Constanta). Another important immigration began in 1950, when communist authorities used the craftsmen from Grabova to build the industrial units in Korçë, Pogradec, Gramsh, Elbasan, and Tirana.

In the 18th century the Grabovë Church was built in the village.

Most common names in Grabova

Family names
Bardhi, Buzo, Cyco, Canuti, Nishku, Trushi, Thano, Verushi.

Male names 
Andoni, Kristo, Dhimo, Theodhor (Dhori), Jani, Jorgji, Llambi, Dhionis, Pandeli, Piro, Spiro, Sotir (Sotiraqi), Themistokli, Thoma, Vangjeli, etc.

Female names 
Dhimitra, Margarita, Maria, Naunka, Parashqevi, Thomaidha, Violeta (Violta)

Notable people originated from Grabova 

Andrei Șaguna, Metropolitan bishop of the Romanian Orthodox Church
Cyril of Bulgaria, the first Patriarch of the restored Bulgarian Patriarchate
Lika Yanko, Bulgarian painter
Çetiri family of painters, icon painters active in central and southern Albania

References 

Populated places in Gramsh, Elbasan
Villages in Elbasan County
Aromanian settlements in Albania